The Manila Chinese Cemetery is the second oldest cemetery in Manila after La Loma Cemetery. The cemetery includes Christian, Buddhist and Taoist burials. Meanwhile, the post-war portion has three major roads bisected by minor roads, aligned NW to SE. Matandang Sora, coming from the main entrance in Felix Huertas going towards Chong Hock Temple, is the main road today. Before the Pacific War the main entrances faced Avenida Rizal. This northwestern is the oldest and most historically significant part of the cemetery. The cemetery was witness to many executions during World War II. Among them were Girl Scouts organizer Josefa Llanes Escoda, Filipino Brigadier General and hero during World War II and Boy Scouts of the Philippines charter member Vicente Lim, literary geniuses Rafael Roces and Manuel Arguilla, star athlete-turned-guerrilla spy Virgilio Lobregat, and Chinese Consul General Yang Guangsheng. Apolinario Mabini was also buried in the cemetery before his remains were transferred to Batangas on July 23, 1956.

History

Prior to the establishment of the Manila Chinese Cemetery, Chinese who observed Buddhism had their burial grounds on a hill slope in Bangkusay, Tondo, near San Lazaro Hospital. In 1843, the Governor-General authorized the Chinese to establish a cemetery in La Loma. It was founded by Lim Ong and Tan Quien Sien (Carlos Palanca) in the 1850s. It was also enlarged on its present site in 1863 when Ong, the gobernadorcillo (mayor) of the Chinese community in Binondo, purchased land in La Loma to provide a decent burial ground for Catholic and non-Catholic Chinese. It would also cater outcasts of society (like those that died from contagious diseases and people who are political enemies of the Spanish Crown) excluded from the nearby La Loma Cemetery's consecrated grounds. It was also later expanded in 1878 by Don Mariano Fernando Yu Chingco, a subsequent gobernadorcillo, when he bought land worth  to expand the cemetery from the Dominican Provincial which used to own the Hacienda de La Loma from which the cemetery was built. This cemetery catered the poor Chinese who could not afford to return to China to bury or send their dead.

Temples and memorials

Chong Hock Tong Temple

Built in 1878, the Chong Hock Tong Temple, prior to its demolition in 2015, was the oldest pre-War Chinese memorial temple in Manila. Its architecture was reminiscent of (but not as elaborate as) southern Fujian temples, as well as those in Indonesia, Singapore, Malaysia, & Taiwan, with their colorful friezes and uniquely upturned eaves; a unique feature were its lateral belfries appended at each end, an obvious Christian influence.

Its demolition on March 15, 2015, by the cemetery's management body Philippine Chinese Charitable Association (PCCA), supposedly due to termite damage, was denounced by heritage conservationists as a violation of R.A. 10066 (National Heritage Act of 2009), despite not being declared by the National Historical Commission of the Philippines (NHCP) as a historical landmark. The PCCA countered, claiming that the temple was on private property.

Supposedly the temple was to be rebuilt in a similar manner by a team of Taiwanese craftsmen & artisans, but was actually reconstructed as an all-stone edifice by mainland Chinese builders, which was then unveiled in a ceremony on June 14, 2017.

It is the only Chinese memorial temple to simultaneously host Taoist, Buddhist, & Christian services, the three major religious beliefs of the Filipino Chinese community. A unique feature that reflects this religious syncretism is the main altar laden with figures of the crucified Christ, the Virgin Mary, Catholic saints, Taoist Deities, Lord Buddha, Amitabha & prominent Buddhist Bodhisattvas (such as Guanyin, Mahāsthāmaprāpta, & Kṣitigarbha).

Liat See Tong Hall

Liat See Tong Temple
was built in the early 1950s in honor of the 10 Chinese community leaders who were executed by the Japanese during World War II.

Due to heightened anti-Japanese sentiment among the Chinese stemming from the Second Sino-Japanese War (preceded in 1931 by the Mukden Incident & the immediate Japanese invasion of Manchuria), the Japanese were wary of the potential trouble the Chinese might cause; as soon as Japan invaded the Philippines, one of their first activities after occupation was the rounding up & subsequent execution of prominent Chinese community leaders.

Above the entrance beam is the dedicatory quote, May their noble spirits ever endure.

Kong Tek Tong Hall
Kong Tek Tong Hall serves as a columbarium for less-affluent burials. Their services extend to the cemetery's perimeter wall niches, where usage is free of charge.

Carlos Palanca Memorial
Located in front of Chong Hock Tong Temple, to which he is credited for financing its construction, the Carlos Palanca Memorial honors Don Carlos Palanca (Tan Quien Sien), illustrious 19th-century Chinese community leader and businessman. It was through his efforts as gobernadorcillo that the cemetery & Chong Hock Tong Temple were built; as only baptized Catholics were permitted burial in the city cemeteries (like the nearby La Loma Cemetery), the need arose for the non-Christian Chinese (termed by the Spanish authorities as Chino infieles, "infidel Chinese") to have their own cemetery.

Cemetery Renovation Memorial
The Manila Chinese Cemetery Renovation Memorial is located adjacent to the front of Liat See Tong Hall.

Apolinario Mabini Pyramid

Located along a street named in his honor (馬美爾路), Apolinario Mabini's former burial site is marked by a triangular pyramid on a raised pedestal, symbolic of his Masonic beliefs (hence his original interment at the cemetery in 1903); and a historical marker by the NHCP (then the "Philippine Historical Committee") affixed in 1963, 7 years after his remains were exhumed & reburied in his hometown at Tanauan, Batangas.

Dr. Clarence Kuangson Young Memorial
Built in 1948 by the Filipino Chinese community, the Dr. Clarence Kuangson Young Memorial pays tribute to the martyrdom of Dr. Clarence Kuangson Young (楊光泩; August 8, 1900 – April 17, 1942), former Consul General (1939-1942) of the Republic of China to the Philippine Islands, and his 7 consular staff members, who refused General MacArthur's offers of evacuation as it was their diplomatic duty to protect the overseas (Chinese) community, and that they will not leave their posts without any authorization.

The 8 diplomats were among the first of the Chinese community to be rounded up by the Japanese authorities, and after 3 months of incarceration, continuous threats, suppression, & torture, were eventually massacred and buried within the cemetery grounds.

At the memorial base is a plaque bearing Dr. Clarence Kuangson Young's name, title, & calligraphy by Chiang Kai-shek bearing the elegiac couplet, Allegiance towards lofty ideals.

Philippine Chinese Anti-Japanese War Memorial Complex

Located at the corner of Consul General Young (光泩跆) & Matandang Sora Roads, the complex consists of the Philippine Chinese Anti-Japanese War Memorial stele built in 1979, & behind it the much larger Philippine Chinese Anti-Japanese War Memorial Hall. These structures commemorate the combined resistance efforts of the Filipino & Chinese communities during World War II.

Two historical markers from the NHCP commemorating the Wha-Chi guerilla forces (1994 & 2005) are affixed on each side of the entrance of the Memorial Hall.

Sun Yat-sen's Motto
Along Consul General Young Road is Sun Yat-sen's personal motto, What is under heaven is for all inscribed on the street-facing rear wall of a private plot.

Ruby Tower Memorial
Built in 1974 and located behind Liat See Tong Temple, the August 2, 1968, Ruby Tower Memorial is dedicated to the 260 mostly Filipino Chinese victims who perished in the collapse of the Ruby Tower building in Santa Cruz, Manila during the 1968 Casiguran earthquake.

Save for a portion of the first & second floors at its northern end (presently preserved as a separate memorial hall to the victims), the entire six-story building collapsed, triggering allegations of poor design & construction, as well as use of low-quality building materials.

Ancestry
According to a study of around 30,000 gravestones in the Manila Chinese Cemetery with marked birthplaces or ancestral cities of the interred, 89.26% were from within the Minnan region in Southern Fujian province, while 9.86% were from Cantonese regions in Guangdong province. More specifically on those of the Minnan region, 65.01% hailed from Jinjiang, 17.25% from Nan’an, 7.94% from Xiamen (city proper), 2.90% from Hui’an (Quanzhou), 1.52% from Longxi, 1.21% from Siming, 1.14% from Quanzhou (city proper), 1.10% from Tong’an, 0.83% from Shishi, 0.57% from Yongchun, and 0.53% from Anxi.

Notable burials
 Dee C. Chuan (1888–1940), founder of the first Chinese bank in the Philippines (Chinabank), the Philippines' oldest existing Chinese-language newspaper Chinese Commercial News; as well as the war-time resistance group "Philippine Chinese Resist-the-Enemy Association", known simply by its shortened name "Khong Tiak Hue" that campaigned for a Japanese trade boycott in the Philippines
 Ma Mon Luk (1896–1961), Chinese cuisine restaurateur known for Mami soup; along with his 2 wives
 Vicente Lim (1888–1944), Filipino Brigadier General during World War II

Notes

References

External links
Chinese cemetery was a bloody battleground
Cemeteries are a time capsule of RP history, culture
Architecture of Manila Chinese Cemetery

Chinese cemeteries
Cemeteries in Metro Manila
Landmarks in the Philippines
Buildings and structures in Santa Cruz, Manila